Soldier of Fortune is a 1976 Italian comedy film directed by Pasquale Festa Campanile. The film tells of the challenge of Barletta in a comic and grotesque style.

Plot summary 
In 1503, while wandering southern Italy in search for employment, soldier of fortune Ettore Fieramosca and his troupe - Bracalone (the group's chronicler), Graiano, Romanello und Fanfulla - run into a siege of the city of Barletta and its Spanish garrison by the French army. Despite his moral code of aiding the underdog, his starving men persuade him to seek their fortune with the French; but when the French commanders, Charles La Motte and the Duke of Namur, contemptuously dismiss them, Ettore sides with the beleaguered Spanish. By single-handedly routing a French assault on the city walls, they win the trust of the city's administrator, Gonzalo Pedro di Guadarrama. However, with Barletta's provisions nearly depleted and Spanish reinforcements still underway, the situation is bleak for the city's inhabitants.

When Ettore aggressively responds to a provocation by the French feasting in full view of the starving population, the French retaliate with a tower-mounted cannon. While trying to find a way to disable the weapon, Ettore and his men encounter the wandering actor troupe of Capoccio, whose female star Leonora develops a crush on Ettore. With the actors' help, Ettore destroys the gun, but in the meantime Graiano defects and attempts to warn the French about the sneak attack. When the French's hesitation in believing his story results in the cannon's destruction, they lay the blame on Graiano and execute him.

The French subsequently capture Capoccio's troupe, but while looking for Graiano, Ettore comes upon them, frees the captives and kidnaps La Motte and two of his knights. Indignant at having been captured through trickery, La Motte refuses to acknowledge defeat and begins insulting Ettore and Gaiano's memory, whereupon Ettore challenges him to a fight. Since, however, according to the rules of chivalry only a knight may lawfully duel a knight, Ettore is granted three days to assemble a band of thirteen Italian volunteers to be knighted and fight thirteen French knights on equal terms. In actuality, di Guadarrama wishes to use the armistice to let his reinforcements from Spain arrive in time.

Ettore loses no time recruiting; some of his chosen countrymen - among them a number of old acquaintances - join voluntarily, some need persuasion through subterfuge or Ettore's fists. At the day of the duel, di Guadarrama declares that his reinforcements have arrived and that Ettore and his band are no longer needed. Ettore, however, tells di Guadarrama that they are now fighting for their honor instead of money, and di Guadarrama grants his blessing. Ettore and La Motte's groups fight on the nearby beach and whittle each other down until Ettore and La Motte, the only ones left, meet in close combat. Ettore subdues La Motte, winning the duel and lifting the siege. Afterwards, Ettore gifts his chronicles to di Guadarrama, only to find out belatedly that Bracalone cannot write, thus having filled the book with meaningless scrawlings.

Cast 
 Bud Spencer: Ettore Fieramosca
 Andréa Ferréol: Leonora
 Philippe Leroy: Charles La Motte
 Marc Porel: Duke of Namur
 Mario Scaccia: Gonzalo Pedro di Guadarrama 
 Mariano Rigillo: Albimonte da Peretola
 Angelo Infanti: Graiano d'Asti
 Enzo Cannavale: Bracalone da Napoli 
 Oreste Lionello: Giovenale da Vetralla
 Franco Agostini: Romanello da Forlì
Gino Pernice: Fanfulla da Lodi
 Eros Pagni: Capoccio da Roma
 Renzo Palmer: Fra Ludovico da Rieti 
 Jacques Herlin: Paredes
 Jacques Dufilho: Mariano da Trani
 Monica Strebel

Soundtrack
As with several other films starring Bud Spencer (on his own or with his partner Terence Hill), the film's soundtrack and its theme song "Oh! Ettore", both composed and performed by Guido & Maurizio De Angelis (who provided the film with an unusually monothematic score) and featuring vocalist Osvaldo Resti mimicking Spencer's on-screen persona as the lead singer in the song, became very popular in Italy at the time of the film's release, and are still popular among the comedy duo's international fan base. The soundtrack album, originally released by soundtrack-specialist company CAM, went rapidly out of print and was re-released on CD for the first time in 2009 (as a strictly limited edition) by Abruzzo-based company Digitmovies Alternative Entertainment.

See also 
 Ettore Fieramosca (1938)
 List of Italian films of 1976

References

External links

1976 films
1970s adventure comedy films
Italian adventure comedy films
Films directed by Pasquale Festa Campanile
Films scored by Guido & Maurizio De Angelis
Films set in the 1500s
1976 comedy films
Italian historical comedy films
1970s Italian-language films
1970s Italian films